Kismet is a 1943 Indian drama film, directed by Gyan Mukherjee, written by Mukherjee with Aghajani Kashmeri, and produced by Bombay Talkies, during the Second World War, while it was in a succession battle between Devika Rani and Sashadhar Mukherjee after owner Himanshu Rai's death. The film was the first big hit in the history of Bombay cinema, and the first blockbuster in Indian cinema.

It stars Ashok Kumar, Mumtaz Shanti, and Shah Nawaz. The film came with some bold themes for the first time in the history of Indian cinema, showing an anti-hero character with two roles and an unmarried girl getting pregnant. It was remade in Tamil as Prema Pasam, and Telugu as Bhale Ramudu. It had patriotic songs which resonated with the then ongoing freedom movement, which became the major catalyst in the box-office success of the film.

Plot

Shekhar (Ashok Kumar) is a pickpocket and con man, who is released from jail after serving his third sentence. It is at once evident that he has no intention of mending his ways, as he relieves a pickpocket of his catch, which happens to be an old, priceless watch.

Shekhar goes to a fence (David), where he meets the original pickpocket, Banke (V.H. Desai). Impressed by Shekhar's prowess, Banke makes him a special offer: he is a small-time thief currently working in the house of a very rich man, who has a considerable fortune stashed away in the safe at his house. Banke, who does not have the expertise to break the lock, asks Shekhar if he would be interested in helping him out. Uninterested in the plan, Shekhar leaves.

As he steps out of the fence's establishment, Shekhar bumps into the original owner of the watch (P.F. Pithawala), an old man desperate for money, who intended to sell the watch and raise the money to see a live performance by Rani (Mumtaz Shanti). Out of compassion Shekhar takes him to the theatre. There the old man points out a prosperous looking man called Indrajit (Mubarak). It turns out that Rani is the daughter of this old man, who was once a rich man and the owner of that theatre. Indrajit was once his employee.

Fortune (kismet) turned things around and today the old man is indebted to Indrajit, from whom he is on the run. The moment the show ends, he flees, but not before he's seen in the company of Shekhar by Rani, from whom he has fled in shame and remorse. Unknown to them, the tormentor Indrajit is himself a tormented man, after his elder son Madan ran away after a fight with his authoritarian father several years ago.

Due to a combination of circumstances, Shekhar ends up staying in Rani's house as a paying guest. There he discovers that she is struggling with a limp, that's affecting her ability to perform on stage. The limited means is a great problem for Rani, the sole bread earner in the house, having to support her younger sister Leela (Chandraprabha). To make things worse, she is constantly troubled by the ruthless Indrajit, who threatens to turn her out of the house if she cannot repay the next instalment of the money payable by her father.

Things take a turn for the worse when Rani discovers that Leela is pregnant out of wedlock with her lover Mohan (Kanu Roy), who happens to be the son of Indrajit. Shekhar, who is falling in love with Rani, decides to help her out. Desperate to raise funds for her cure, he takes up Banke's offer to break the vault of his employer, who is none other than Indrajit. The attempted robbery goes awry, but Shekhar escapes, dropping behind the chain he always wears. Indrajit immediately recognises that as that of his long lost son Madan.

Desperate to get back his son, Indrajit organises a live programme featuring Rani, knowing that his love for the young lady will impel Shekhar to come. Rani' father turns up at the theatre, as does Indrajit's entire family. As expected, Shekhar turns up at the theatre, where he is immediately recognised as Indrajit's long lost son Madan.  Delighted to find his beloved son, Indrajit immediately turns a new leaf, cancelling his former boss' debts and asking him for the hand of both his daughters for his sons.

Cast

 Ashok Kumar  as Shekhar/Madan
 Mumtaz Shanti  as Rani
 Shah Nawaz  as Inspector Saahab
 V.H.Desai  as Baanke
 Moti  as Women 
 P.F.Pithawala  as Rani's father
 Chandraprabha  as Leela, Rani's sister
 Kanu Roy  as Mohan, Leela's lover
 David  as The Fence/ Pawn-shop owner
 Haroon  as Indrajeet's Manager 
 Baby Kamala  as Young Rani
 Mubarak  as Indrajeet Babu
Support cast
 Prahlad, Jagannath Aurora, S. Gulab, Surve, Fateh Mohamed

Reception

Kismet was severely criticised by Babu Rao Patel of Filmindia magazine for glorifying crime and portraying a criminal in good light. Despite the criticism, the movie shattered all box office records, becoming the first Indian movie to gross 10 million (10 million) at the box office. It ran for 187 continuous weeks at Roxy Cinema in Calcutta, a record that stood for 32 years.

The song दूर हटो दुनियावालों, हिन्दुस्तान हमारा है ("Step away o foreigners, Hindustan is ours"), which slipped past the censors, was an immensely popular song in the mid 40s, coming as it did less than 6 months after Mahatma Gandhi called for the Quit India Movement. Although superficially addressed to the Germans and Japanese (with whom the British rulers were at war then), the patriotic overtones became at once evident to contemporary audiences. At screenings of Kismet, the reels would be rewound and the song played multiple times on public demand. The unprecedented popularity of the song forced the lyricist Kavi Pradeep to go underground to avoid being arrested by the British authorities for sedition.

Legacy

Kismet was also the first Indian movie to use the lost and found formula used in several Hindi movies in the 1960s and 1970s, notably Waqt (1965), Yaadon ki Baraat (1973), and Amar Akbar Anthony (1977). The unprecedented success of Kismet established Ashok Kumar as the first superstar of Hindi cinema. He remained the most popular actor in Hindi cinema until the early 50s.

The 1961 movie Boy Friend, featuring Madhubala, Shammi Kapoor and  Dharmendra was a remake of Kismet. In the 1968 movie Padosan, when asked to think of a romantic song, Bhola immediately remembers the door hato duniyawalo song.

Soundtrack
The music of the film by Anil Biswas introduced the "full chorus" for the first time in Hindi cinema. The film gave memorable hits like the patriotic "Aaj Himalay Ki Choti Se", the sad "Ghar Ghar Mein Diwali" and a soothing lullaby, "Dheere Dheere Aa". The last was a duet between Amirbai Karnataki and Ashok Kumar, which added to the success of the film that is still known as one of his finest works.
 "Aaj Himalay Ki Choti Se – Door Hato Ai Duniya Walo" - Singer: Ameerbai Karnataki, Khan Mastana
 "Ab Tere Siwa Kaun Mera Krishan Kanhaiya" - Singer: Ameerbai Karnataki
 "Ai Duniya Bata – Ghar Ghar Me Diwali Hai" - Singer: Ameerbai Karnataki
 "Dhire Dhire Aa Re Badal, Mera Bulbul Sau Raha Hai" (female) - Singer: Ameerbai Karnataki
 "Dhire Dhire Aa Re Badal, Mera Bulbul Sau Raha Hai" (male) - Singer: Ameerbai Karnataki, Ashok Kumar
 "Ham Aisi Qisamat Ko, Ek Din Hansaaye" - Singer: Ameerbai Karnataki, Arun Kumar
 "Papihaa Re Mere Piyaa Se Kahiyo Jaay" - Singer: Parul Ghosh
 "Tere Dukh Ke Din Phirenge, Zindagi Ban Ke Jiye Jaa" - Singer: Arun Kumar

Door Hato O Duniya Walon

In the patriotic song, "Door hato O Duniya walon, Hindustan hamara hay" ("Step away o foreigners, Hindustan is ours"), penned by Kavi Pradeep, a negative reference to Japan was used – "Tum na kisike aage jhunkna, German ho ya Japani" ("Don't you bow in front of anyone, be it the Germans or the Japanese") – which allowed it to get past the heavy British censorship of the time. But the hidden meaning got through to the people and backed by Anil Biswas's uplifting score, the song became an instant hit amidst the atmosphere of rising nationalistic fervour. The British authorities soon realized their mistake, and wanted to ban the film. An arrest warrant was issued for the film's lyricist Pradeep, who had to go underground to avoid arrest.

Reception
The film went on to become a major success and gave Indian cinema its first title of superstar, Ashok Kumar. According to the numbers, it has been given the status of All-Time Blockbuster. Its net gross was Rs. 1.1 Crore in 1943.  This record was beaten in 1949 by Barsaat.

Box office
Presenting some bold themes for the first time in Bollywood in the 40s – an anti-hero and a single pregnant girl for instance. One of the earliest all India blockbusters of Bollywood, this movie also introduced double-role acting for the first time through its first superstar, Ashok Kumar. Box Office India reported that the film collected a nett gross of 11million ($3.32million) and declared the film an "All Time Blockbuster". Its gross amounts to over 500crore ($ million) if adjusted for inflation today.

Release and Box Office Records

The film's premiere was held on 9 Jan 1943 at Roxy Talkies in Mumbai. It ran for over 50 weeks in Roxy Mumbai and was the first film to celebrate a silver jubilee in its re run in the same city i.e. Mumbai.

The film was released on 24 Sept. 1943 in Roxy Cinema Kolkata and ran uninterrupted for 187 weeks earning more than 12 lakhs nett from a single theatre which was a record.

Kismet was the first all India blockbuster and is still the biggest hit of undivided India.

It celebrated golden jubilees at Kolkata, Mumbai, Karachi and Delhi.

It also celebrated silver jubilees at Mumbai (re-release), Ahmedabad, Baroda, Surat, Nasik, Sholapur, Lahore, Peshawar, Hyderabad (Sindh), Chennai, Hyderabad (Deccan), Allahabad, Kanpur, Varanasi, Lucknow and other major centers.

See also
 List of highest-grossing Bollywood films

Notes

References

External links

 
 Kismet (1943) on indiancine.ma

1943 films
1940s Hindi-language films
Indian black-and-white films
1943 crime drama films
Hindi films remade in other languages
Indian crime drama films
Films directed by Gyan Mukherjee